Petla Uma Sankara Ganesh is an Indian politician from the YSR Congress Party. He is a current Member of the Andhra Pradesh Legislative Assembly from Narsipatnam constituency for 2019.

Biography 
Uma Sankara Ganesh was born in a Telugu-speaking Hindu, Velama family in Narsipatnam, Visakhapatnam District of Andhra Pradesh. His native village is Bapiraju Kothapalli, Kotauratla Mandal Visakhapatnam District in Andhra Pradesh. He studied at St. Theresa R.C.M. high school in Pedaboddepalli. He is the brother of Telugu Film Director Puri Jagannadh.

References

YSR Congress Party politicians
Living people
Year of birth missing (living people)
Andhra Pradesh MLAs 2019–2024